The 1925 Loyola University Chicago football team was an American football team that represented Loyola University Chicago as an independent during the 1925 college football season.  In its third season under head coach Roger Kiley, the team compiled a 6–2 record and outscored opponents by a total of 70 to 39. The team played three of its home games at Loyola Field and one game each at Grant Park Stadium and Soldier Field.

Schedule

References

Loyola University Chicago
Loyola Ramblers football seasons
Loyola University Chicago football